West Bangka Regency is a regency (kabupaten) of Bangka Belitung Islands Province, Indonesia. It comprises the western part of Bangka Island, together with a number of small islands off its coast. The regency covers an area of 2,820.61 km2 and had a population of 175,110 at the 2010 Census, rising to 204,612 at the 2020 census. The town of Muntok is its regency seat.

Administrative districts
At the time of the 2010 Census, the Regency was divided into five districts (kecamatan), but a sixth (Parittiga) was created subsequently. These are tabulated below with their areas and their populations at the 2010 Census and the 2020 Census. The table includes the number of administrative villages (rural desa and urban kelurahan) in each district, and its post code.

Note: (a) including three offshore islands - Pulau Batubelilik, Pulau Batudatek and Pulau Semumbung. (b) except the villages of Tanjung (post code 33311), Sungai Batu (post code 33312) and Sungai Daeng (post code 33313). (c) there are 85 offshore islets in Jebus and Parittiga Districts. (d) the 2010 population of Parittiga District is included in the figure for Jebus District, from which it was cut out.

References

External links

Regencies of Bangka Belitung Islands